Regina, Saskatchewan, Canada is a travel destination for residents of southern Saskatchewan and the immediately neighbouring regions of the U.S. states of North Dakota and Montana. It is also a convenient rest-stop for travellers along the Trans-Canada Highway. Attractions for visitors include the following:

RCMP Heritage Centre - Housed in a breathtaking stone, glass and concrete building designed by world-renowned architect Arthur Erickson, the RCMP Heritage Centre tells the story of the RCMP using state of the art exhibits, multimedia technologies and engaging programming and tours.
Royal Saskatchewan Museum (museum of natural history)
Saskatchewan Science Centre (interactive science museum with IMAX theatre) in the former city powerhouse on the north shore of Wascana Lake opposite the Conexus Arts Centre.
MacKenzie Art Gallery, formerly located on the Regina College campus of the University of Regina and now relocated to the T.C. Douglas Building on the southwest extremity of Wascana Centre.
Saskatchewan Legislative Building 
Royal Canadian Mounted Police national training centre and museum
The Globe Theatre - Saskatchewan's largest professional theatre company, and one of only two arena theatres in North America. Produces six shows in the Evraz Main Stage Season each year, and up to four shows in the Shumiatcher Sandbox Series.
Government House (Saskatchewan) (residence of NWT and Saskatchewan lieutenant-governors 1892-1944; restored to 19th century ambiance and open to the public)
Casino Regina (located in the remodeled Canadian Pacific Railway station on Saskatchewan Drive, formerly South Railway Street)
The University of Regina — it is an important reason why many visitors come to Regina; its website (see main article) is helpful. The new campus (and the Wascana Centre itself) was originally designed by Minoru Yamasaki, the architect of the original World Trade Center in New York, in a stark modernist style.

Mosaic Stadium — a municipally-owned football stadium is home to the Saskatchewan Roughriders, the Regina Rams and several major tenants and events; it opened in 2017.
Evraz Place — according to the City of Regina's website, is the second largest trade show and exhibition space in Canada. It the venue for:
 Buffalo Days Exhibition — similar to an American County or State fair — usually held the first week of August, it now includes the Conklin Shows Midway rides which visit an assortment of agricultural fairs throughout the summer months on the U.S. and Canadian prairies.
 Royal Red Arabian Horse Show — the top event in the world of showing of Arabian horses in North America with several celebrities and dignitaries attending with their horses.
 Canadian Western Agribition — held in late November yearly, it is one of the largest livestock shows in North America with attendees from as far as Europe and Japan.
 Farm Progress Show — held in late spring it is touted as North America's largest dryland farming show with emphasis on the newest technology and equipment.
 Brandt Centre — a combination facility that seats up to 7500 people that serves primarily as ice surface for hockey, curling and concerts, but, also hosts the National Finals Rodeo during Agribition. The Brandt Centre is often referred to by its former name: the Regina Agridome.
 Credit Union EventPlex — a 90.000 sq.ft. multi-purpose facility that opened in the summer of 2005. It is home to Regina's indoor soccer community with its removable turf and has hosted the Brier patch (a beer garden that holds approximately 6400 people) for the 2006 Tim Hortons Brier and the wrestling venue for the 2005 Canada Summer Games.
Most buildings at Exhibition Park are connected by walkways, and the public need not go outdoors to move about the fairgrounds. There are currently plans to demolish or upgrade most of the buildings in Evraz place with the notion of keeping everything connected and logically placed on the grounds. The work should commence in late 2007 and will continue as budgetary and scheduled events occur.
Regina Floral Conservatory

Culture of Regina, Saskatchewan
Tourism in Saskatchewan